The Virginia Legislative Black Caucus is an American political organization composed of Black members elected to the Virginia General Assembly.

Mission
The Virginia Legislative Black Caucus (VLBC) is committed to improving the economic, educational, political, and social conditions of African Americans, as well as historically underrepresented groups in Virginia. A vital part of VLBC’s mission is to raise the consciousness of other groups to the contributions made by African Americans to the Commonwealth and the Nation.

Current membership
List of officers:

Current members 

 Virginia State Del. Lamont Bagby (D-74th)
 Virginia State Del. Jeff Bourne (D-71st)
 Virginia State Del. Nadarius Clark (D-79th)
 Virginia State Del. Jackie Glass (politician) (D-89th)
 Virginia State Del. Cliff Hayes (D-77th)
 Virginia State Del. Charniele Herring (D-46th) 
 Virginia State Del. Clinton Jenkins (D-76th)
 Virginia State Sen. Mamie Locke (D-2nd) 
 Virginia State Sen. Louise Lucas (D-18th) 
 Virginia State Del. Michelle Maldonado (D-50th) 
 Virginia State Sen. Jennifer McClellan (D-9th) 
 Virginia State Del. Delores McQuinn (D-70th)
 Virginia State Del. Candi Mundon King (D-2nd)
 Virginia State Del. Marcia Price (D-95th)
 Virginia State Del. Sam Rasoul (D-11th)
 Virginia State Del. Briana Sewell (D-51st)
 Virginia State Del. Don Scott (D-80th)
 Virginia State Sen. Lionell Spruill, Sr. (D-5th) 
 Virginia State Del. Luke Torian (D-52nd) 
 Virginia State Del. Jeion Ward (D-92nd)
 Virginia State Del. Angelia Williams Graves (D-90th)

Past members

Virginia State Sen. Henry L. Marsh (D-16th) Dinwiddie and Petersburg. Part of Chesterfield, Hopewell, Prince George, and Richmond City
Virginia State Sen. Yvonne B. Miller (D-5th) Chesapeake, Norfolk, and Virginia Beach
Virginia State Del. Kenneth Cooper Alexander (D-89th) Norfolk
Virginia State Del. Mamye BaCote (D-95th) Hampton and Newport News
Virginia State Del. Rosalyn Dance (D-63rd) Chesterfield, Dinwiddie, and Petersburg
Virginia State Del. Algie Howell (D-90th) Chesapeake, Norfolk, and Virginia Beach
Virginia State Del. Matthew James  (D-80th) Portsmouth
Virginia State Del. Onzlee Ware (D-11th) Roanoke City and Roanoke County
Virginia State Del. Joseph C. Lindsey (D-90th)
Virginia State Del. Jennifer Carroll Foy (D-2nd)

Staff

References

Virginia General Assembly
State Legislative Black Caucuses